Anthurium acaule is a herbaceous plant native to the Lesser Antilles. The plant has a complicated taxonomic history, and the name Anthurium acaule has been applied to several other plants.

Description
Epiphytic.  Petiole length 2–6 cm, leaf blades unlobed, measuring between 20–60 cm in length and 12–25 cm in width. Small black dots present on leaf blades. Fruit a white berry measuring 1 cm long. Inflorescence 2–25 cm in length and 1-1.5 cm in width.

References

acaule